Charles Buchel (Karl August Büchel) (1872–1950) was a British artist.

Buchel was born in Mainz, Germany, but immigrated to England as a child. Buchel studied art at the Royal Academy Schools. He was hired by the actor-manager, Sir Herbert Beerbohm Tree in 1898, and worked with him for sixteen years.

Buchel painted several portraits of Tree, and also designed theatrical programmes and advertising posters for the theatre. He drew many illustrations for the theatre magazines of his day. Buchel is best remembered for having painted many of the stage stars of his era, including Lily Langtry, Henry Irving and George Alexander.

Buchel was married in 1897 to Janet Buyers and they had a son, Philip Stuart Buchel, born in 1906.

While the exact date is unknown, Charles Buchel died in 1950 at 78 years old.  His life work can be found in the National Portrait Gallery, as well as the Victoria and Albert Museum.

References

1872 births
1950 deaths
20th-century British painters
British male painters
19th-century British male artists
20th-century British male artists